The 1893 Auburn Tigers football team represented Auburn University in the 1893 college football season. The squad was undefeated at 3–0–2 and outscored opponents 116–62.

Auburn, then known as the Agricultural and Mechanical College of Alabama, counts the February 22, 1893, game versus Alabama towards the 1893 season, while Alabama counts it toward their 1892 season. Head coach D. M. Balliet led Auburn to a 32–22 victory in the game.  George Roy Harvey coached the four games that Auburn played the following fall.

Schedule

See also
 List of the first college football games in each US state

References

Auburn
Auburn Tigers football seasons
College football undefeated seasons
Auburn Tigers football